Fall Brawl '98: War Games was the sixth Fall Brawl professional wrestling pay-per-view (PPV) event produced by World Championship Wrestling (WCW). It took place on September 13, 1998, from the Lawrence Joel Veterans Memorial Coliseum in Winston-Salem, North Carolina. As of 2014 the event is available on the WWE Network.

Production

Background
The WarGames match was created when Dusty Rhodes was inspired by a viewing of Mad Max Beyond Thunderdome. It was originally used as a specialty match for the Four Horsemen. The first WarGames match took place at The Omni in Atlanta during the NWA's Great American Bash '87 tour, where it was known as War Games: The Match Beyond. It became a traditional Fall Brawl event from 1993 to 1998.

Storylines
The event featured professional wrestling matches that involve different wrestlers from pre-existing scripted feuds and storylines. Professional wrestlers portray villains, heroes, or less distinguishable characters in the scripted events that build tension and culminate in a wrestling match or series of matches.

Event

Prior to the match between Rick Steiner and Scott Steiner, WCW commissioner J. J. Dillon warned Scott that he would be permanently banned from WCW had he refused to wrestle against his brother in any way. The match ended in a no-contest after Buff Bagwell pretended to re-injure his neck. As per a prematch stipulation, Saturn's victory freed The Flock from Raven's control; if Saturn had lost, he would have had to become Raven's servant.  Chris Kanyon was also handcuffed to the ring. During the match, Kidman interfered on Saturn's behalf. In the WarGames Match Diamond Dallas Page pinned Stevie Ray after a Diamond Cutter. For the first time ever in a WarGames match, pinfalls were allowed. As a result of Page getting the pinfall victory; Page earned a shot at the WCW World Heavyweight Championship at Halloween Havoc.

A match between The Giant and Meng was advertised on WCW.com, but did not take place. WCW.com also advertised a Juventud Guerrera vs. Kaz Hayashi match, but it was announced that the match would actually be Guerrera vs. Silver King the night before the pay-per-view on WCW Saturday Night.

The match between Curt Hennig and Dean Malenko, while heavily built in storylines, was not advertised ahead of time.

Reception

The event has received negative reviews from critics.

In 2012, Jack Bramma of 411Mania gave the event a rating of 4.0 [Poor], stating, "There are TWO good matches on the entire PPV and only one above ***. If there was a fifth rider of the Apocalypse, it'd look something like this PPV."

In 2021, Lance Augustine of TJR Wrestling gave the event a rating of 4/10, stating, "The Wrestling Observer poll had this show at a 99.4% thumbs down rating. I wanted to go into it with an open mind, and I have to say, the fans were right. There was nothing on this show of any substance and had a lot more angles than a Pay-Per-View should. The fact that this is the second straight month that Goldberg didn’t defend the title on a big show is ridiculous, but it’s like yelling down a hallway at this point. The one standout match on the show was Saturn vs. Raven, which should tell you the quality of the rest of the show. There were some spots here and there, but overall, this show was not very good."

In 2021, Thomas Hall of Wrestling Rumors gave the event a rating of F-, stating, "If there was a rating lower than this, the show would get that. This was dreadful throughout with Raven vs. Saturn being the only match worth checking out and even that’s a stretch. They took all of the good potential that WCW had been building up for months and wasted it in one night. No Guerrero, no Goldberg (he couldn’t even show up and beat on Jericho?), no Flair, and Anderson gets beaten down because we need to keep Curt Hennig looking strong. This ranks up there with the worst shows of all time and I can easily see why it was named the worst show of the year for 1998."

The event was named as the Worst Major Wrestling Show of 1998 by the Wrestling Observer Newsletter.

Results

References

Professional wrestling in North Carolina
Events in North Carolina
1998 in North Carolina
Fall Brawl
September 1998 events in the United States
1998 World Championship Wrestling pay-per-view events